The Governor of Magadan Oblast is the head of that federal subject of Russia. Governor is elected by the people of Magadan Oblast for five years.

The current governor is Sergey Nosov.

List

Timeline

References

 
Magadan Oblast
Politics of Magadan Oblast